Banat Air Flight 166 was an Antonov Antonov An-24 (registration ) chartered on 13 December 1995 from Romavia by Banat Air.

It was due to fly from Verona, Italy, to Timișoara, Romania, when it crashed shortly after take-off, killing all eight crewmembers and 41 passengers. It later emerged that the aircraft was severely overloaded and its wings were contaminated with ice and snow. The accident was the 116th loss of an Antonov 24.

Accident
Whilst parked in parking spot B6 at Verona-Villafranca Airport, snow fell continuously and the outside temperature was 0 °C. After forty-one passengers boarded Flight 166 to Romania, the pilot declined to have the plane deiced. At just past 19:30 local time, the aircraft taxied to the end of runway 23; however heavy traffic delayed the departure.

When the Banat Air flight was cleared for takeoff, the outside temperature was below the freezing point. Shortly after lifting off, the aircraft reached its maximum speed. Banking to the right, the airspeed dropped dramatically, and so the pilot applied nose down elevator, causing the speed to increase again. Continuing their right hand bank, the flight crew again applied nose up elevator. The speed then dropped significantly, and the plane banked at sixty seven degrees. The pilots were unable to regain control of the plane and it struck the ground right-wing first, breaking up and bursting into flames.

Investigation

Investigators concluded that there were multiple causes for the accident, including the disruption of airflow over the wings due to ice formation on the wings, due to the plane taking off without being de-iced. They also determined that spatial disorientation and the plane being overloaded by about 2000 kilograms played key parts in the accident.

See also
 Aviation safety
 List of accidents and incidents involving commercial aircraft

References

External links

Romanian (YR) air incidents at baaa-acro.com (Archive)
A perspective of the accident in the wider context of the Italian air safety, also referring to the Linate Airport Disaster

Accidents and incidents involving the Antonov An-24
Airliner accidents and incidents caused by weather
Aviation accidents and incidents in Italy
Airliner accidents and incidents caused by ice
Aviation accidents and incidents in 1995
Banat Air accidents and incidents
1995 in Italy
1995 in Romania
December 1995 events in Europe
1995 disasters in Italy